Arnold Ruge (13 September 1802 – 31 December 1880) was a German philosopher and political writer. He was the older brother of Ludwig Ruge.

Studies in university and prison
Born in Bergen auf Rügen, he studied in Halle, Jena and Heidelberg.  As an advocate of a free and united Germany, he shared in the student agitations of 1821–24, and was jailed from 1824 to 1830 in the fortress of Kolberg, where he studied Plato and the Greek poets.  Moving to Halle on his release, he published a number of plays — including Schill und die Seinen, a tragedy — and translations of ancient Greek texts — e.g. Oedipus at Colonus.  He became a Privatdozent at the University of Halle in 1832.

Hegelians
He also became associated with the Young Hegelians.  In 1837, with E. T. Echtermeyer, he founded the Hallesche Jahrbücher für deutsche Kunst und Wissenschaft. In this periodical he discussed the questions of the time from the point of view of the Hegelian philosophy.  According to Frederick Copleston:
"Ruge shared Hegel's belief that history is a progressive advance towards the realization of freedom, and that freedom is attained in the State, the creation of the rational General Will.[...] At the same time he criticized Hegel for having given an interpretation of history which was closed to the future, in the sense that it left no room for novelty."
The Jahrbücher was detested by the orthodox party in Prussia; and was finally suppressed by the Saxon government in 1843, and Ruge left for Paris.

In Paris, Ruge co-edited the Deutsch–Französische Jahrbücher with Karl Marx briefly. He had little sympathy with Marx's socialistic theories, and soon left him. He left Paris in 1845 for Switzerland, and then became a bookseller in Leipzig.

Revolutions of 1848
In the revolutionary movement of 1848, he organized the extreme left in the Frankfurt parliament, and for some time he lived in Berlin as the editor of the Die Reform. He supported the Polish demands during the revolution, but based on his belief that failure to meet Polish demands would result in Russia unleashing "the hatred of the entire Slavic element, of this monstrous family of peoples."

The Prussian government intervened and Ruge soon afterwards left again for Paris, hoping, through his friend Alexandre Ledru-Rollin, to establish relations between German and French republicans; but in 1849 both Ledru-Rollin and Ruge had to take refuge in London.

London and Brighton

In London, in company with Giuseppe Mazzini and other advanced politicians, he formed a "European Democratic Committee." From this Ruge soon withdrew, and in 1850, Ruge moved to Brighton to live as a teacher and writer. In 1866, he vigorously supported Prussia against Austria in the Austro-Prussian War, and in 1870, he supported Germany against France in the Franco-Prussian War. On a smaller scale, while in Brighton, he was chairman of the successful Park Crescent Residents' Association. In his last years, beginning in 1877, he received from the German government a pension of 1000 marks.

He died in Brighton in 1880.

Works
In his time, Ruge was a leader in religious and political liberalism. In 1846-48 his
Gesammelte Schriften (Collected writings) were published in ten volumes. After this
time he wrote, among other books, Manifest an die deutsche Nation (1866), Geschichte unserer Zeit (1881), Unser System, Revolutionsnovellen,
Die Loge des Humanismus, and Aus früherer Zeit (his
memoirs; 1863–67). He also wrote many poems, and several dramas and
romances, and translated into German various English works,
including the Letters of Junius and Buckle's History of Civilization.
His Letters and Diary (1825–80) were published by Paul Nerrlich
(Berlin, 1885–87). See A. W. Bolin's L. Feuerbach, pp. 127–52
(Stuttgart, 1891).

Notes

References
 

1802 births
1880 deaths
People from Bergen auf Rügen
19th-century philosophers
19th-century German people
19th-century German philosophers
Continental philosophers
Members of the Frankfurt Parliament
People from Swedish Pomerania
People of the Revolutions of 1848
Martin Luther University of Halle-Wittenberg alumni
University of Jena alumni
Heidelberg University alumni
19th-century German writers
19th-century German male writers